Null is a Foetus EP released in 1995 by Big Cat in the UK. Null acts as a De facto single for "Verklemmt," released on Gash. Promotional copies of Null were distributed by Sony/Columbia in the US, but the EP had no official US release. Null was later rereleased as half of the Null/Void double-CDEP set.

Track listing

Personnel 
Brian Freeman – art direction
Rob Sutton – engineering
J. G. Thirlwell (as Foetus) – instruments, arrangement, production, illustrations
Howie Weinberg – mastering

References

External links 
 
 Null at foetus.org

1995 EPs
Foetus (band) albums
Albums produced by JG Thirlwell